The Tyler Block was a three-story building in Louisville, Kentucky best known for its landmark  Renaissance Revival limestone facade. It was located on the north side of Jefferson Street between Third and Fourth streets. Built in 1874, it was designed by Henry Wolters and named after owner Levi Tyler. It was razed 100 years later in 1974 to make way for what is now the Kentucky International Convention Center. Many campaigned to have the Tyler Block's facade incorporated into the center, but the new building was instead built in the then fashionable brutalist architecture style.

The building was listed on the National Register of Historic Places in 1973.

References

Demolished buildings and structures in Louisville, Kentucky
National Register of Historic Places in Louisville, Kentucky
Commercial buildings on the National Register of Historic Places in Kentucky
Buildings and structures demolished in 1974

Former National Register of Historic Places in Kentucky
Renaissance Revival architecture in Kentucky